Lindgomyces is a genus of aquatic fungi in the  family Lindgomycetaceae. Described as new to science in 2010, the genus contains six species known from Japan and the USA.

References

External links

Pleosporales
Aquatic fungi